Norman Chapman (1937– July 1995) was an English drummer who played with the Beatles.

After Tommy Moore left the group in June 1960, Chapman joined the Silver Beatles. However, Chapman only played three shows with the group in June 1960 before he left due to being called up for national service. He was replaced in the group by Pete Best. After finishing his time in the national service he played with several local bands, including Ernie Mack and The Saturated Seven.

Chapman died of cancer in July 1995 at the age of 58.

References

External links
 

English rock drummers
20th-century English musicians
20th-century drummers
1937 births
1995 deaths
20th-century British military personnel
Deaths from cancer in England
The Beatles members